Martin Walsh may refer to:

Martin Walsh (film editor) (born 1955), film editor
Martin Walsh (footballer) (born 1966), Scottish footballer
Martin Walsh (police officer) (born 1945), Garda Síochána sergeant
Martin Walsh (producer) (born 1967), film producer
Martin Walsh (rower) (born 1962), South African Olympic rower
Marty Walsh (ice hockey) (1884–1915), ice hockey player
Marty Walsh (musician) (born 1952), guitarist
Marty Walsh (born 1967), United States Secretary of Labor, former mayor of Boston

See also
Martin Welsh (1882–1953), United States District Judge